TV Terror: Felching a Dead Horse is a various artists compilation album released on September 23, 1997, by Re-Constriction Records. The idea came to fruition when Permission founder Jayson Elliot discovered Monochrome - A Tribute to the Sisters of Mercy via a car ride through Chicago in June 1994 and compiled the music on the second disc. Its release was the cause of the first utterance of the word "felch" on national television when Kurt Loder reported its release on MTV News.

Reception
Aiding & Abetting said "there are more good shots than bad ones. This is one of those pseudo-tribute albums that actually works, mostly because the artists involved didn't feel constrained by convention." Lex Marburger of Lollipop Magazine praised the tracks for the "way they hit you, make you shudder or howl with laughter, then depart before they get tiresome." Jeff Stark of SF Weekly gave the album a positive review.

A critic at Black Monday was largely negative towards the compilation, noting the covers by Numb and Alien Sex Fiend as being highlights but saying "TV Terror is to be taken lightly, with most of the music lacking in quality and merit." Sonic Boom criticized the inconsistent production while noting "there are quite a handful of selections on both discs which should both amuse and incite you to go postal near the neighborhood kids."

Track listing

Accolades

Personnel
Adapted from the TV Terror: Felching a Dead Horse liner notes.

 Jayson Elliot – compiling, cover art, design
 Eric Fisher – photography
 Ric Laciak – mastering

Release history

References

External links 
 

1997 compilation albums
Electro-industrial compilation albums
Industrial rock compilation albums
Re-Constriction Records compilation albums
Television theme song albums
Covers albums